Yngve Johansson may refer to:
Yngve Johansson (footballer)
Yngve Johansson (ice hockey)